Malte Persson (born 1976) is a Swedish author.  His first book Livet på den här planeten "Life on this planet", a novel, was published in 2002.  His subsequent two books are collections of poetry, Apolloprojektet "The Apollo Project" (2004) and Dikter "Poems" (2007).  Persson has been said to belong to modernist group of LANGUAGE-poetry forming around the Swedish literary magazine OEI, but has also challenged this view, being a cultivator of tradition and traditionally formal verse. In 2008 Edelcrantz förbindelser was published, an historical novel set in the 18th and 19th centuries and focusing on the life of Abraham Niclas Edelcrantz. Underjorden "The Underground", a sequence of sonnets on the Stockholm metro, was published in 2011.

Persson is also a translator, among others of Francis Ponge, Thomas Kling and Harry Mathews.
 
As a critic he writes for the daily newspaper Expressen.  On his weblog Errata (2004-2010) Persson commented on the literary life in Sweden.  "Errata" used to be most well-known not for Persson's articles, but for the debates being initiated and conducted among its readers in the commentary field.

Bibliography 
 Livet på den här planeten, 2002
 Apolloprojektet, 2004
 Dikter, 2007
 Edelcrantz Förbindelser, 2008
 Underjorden, 2011

English Translations 
 Fantasy. Translated by Saskia Vogel. Readux Books, 2013, Sample.

External links 
Author home page
Perssons Publishing House
Errata Weblog
Swedish newspapers articles and reviews on Malte Persson

1976 births
21st-century Swedish poets
Swedish male writers
Living people
Swedish male poets
21st-century Swedish novelists
Swedish historical novelists
Date of birth missing (living people)
Swedish translators
21st-century male writers
21st-century translators